Tiago Filipe Figueiras Gomes (born 19 August 1985) is a Portuguese former professional footballer who played as a central midfielder.

Club career

Portugal
Born in Vila Franca de Xira, Lisbon District, Gomes was part of the S.L. Benfica youth system for a few years, and his first professional seasons were also spent in the Lisbon area, with G.D. Estoril Praia, Clube Oriental de Lisboa and Odivelas FC.

He made his debut in Primeira Liga with another team from the capital, C.F. Estrela da Amadora, first appearing against Associação Naval 1º de Maio on 27 August 2006, and was a permanent fixture throughout the entire campaign, playing alongside another Benfica youth product, namesake Tiago Henrique Damil Gomes.

Steaua and Hércules
On 29 May 2008, after a two-month spell in Málaga CF in which he failed to make an official appearance due to delays in the arrival of his international transfer, Gomes joined FC Steaua București on loan from Estrela, with the Romanian club retaining an option to buy him at the end of the season. In mid-July 2009, he was sold to Hércules CF in Spain for €400,000 upon signing a three-year contract. He appeared in 37 Segunda División games and scored six goals in his first season, in a return to La Liga after a 13-year absence.

Gomes was again regularly used in 2010–11. On 24 April 2011 he netted his first Spanish top-flight goal in a 1–0 home win over Deportivo de La Coruña, adding a second two games later against Racing de Santander in a 2–3 home loss, but the team from Alicante was eventually relegated after only one year.

Blackpool
On 24 July 2012, Gomes signed a one-year deal with Football League Championship club Blackpool after his contract with Hércules expired.

He made his competitive debut on 18 August by starting and playing 56 minutes in a 2–0 victory at Millwall. He finished his first and only season with 27 overall appearances (no goals).

APOEL
On 14 June 2013, Gomes moved teams and countries again, penning a two-year contract with APOEL FC from Cyprus. He made his debut against NK Maribor on 31 July, in a 1–1 home draw in the third qualifying round of the UEFA Champions League. In the 2013–14 season he appeared in three games in the group stage of the UEFA Europa League, and helped his side conquer the treble of league, Cup and Super Cup.

Gomes scored his first official goal for APOEL on 21 March 2015, in his team's 2–2 home draw with Apollon Limassol in the league playoffs. In his second year, he played every game in his team's Champions League campaign.

On 25 May 2015, one day after winning his second consecutive double, Gomes left the club as it was announced his contract would not be renewed.

International career
Gomes made two appearances for Portugal at under-21 level, his first call-up being in March 2007.

Club statistics

Honours
APOEL
Cypriot First Division: 2013–14, 2014–15
Cypriot Cup: 2013–14, 2014–15
Cypriot Super Cup: 2013

References

External links
APOEL official profile

1985 births
Living people
People from Vila Franca de Xira
Sportspeople from Lisbon District
Portuguese footballers
Association football midfielders
Primeira Liga players
Liga Portugal 2 players
Segunda Divisão players
G.D. Estoril Praia players
Clube Oriental de Lisboa players
Odivelas F.C. players
C.F. Estrela da Amadora players
Liga I players
FC Steaua București players
La Liga players
Segunda División players
Hércules CF players
English Football League players
Blackpool F.C. players
Cypriot First Division players
APOEL FC players
Nea Salamis Famagusta FC players
Doxa Katokopias FC players
Malaysia Super League players
Melaka United F.C. players
Portugal under-21 international footballers
Portuguese expatriate footballers
Expatriate footballers in Romania
Expatriate footballers in Spain
Expatriate footballers in England
Expatriate footballers in Cyprus
Expatriate footballers in Malaysia
Portuguese expatriate sportspeople in Romania
Portuguese expatriate sportspeople in Spain
Portuguese expatriate sportspeople in England
Portuguese expatriate sportspeople in Cyprus
Portuguese expatriate sportspeople in Malaysia